Lukáš Krbeček (born 27 October 1985) is a Czech former footballer.

External links
 
 Guardian Football
 
 Lukáš Krbeček at Kicker

Czech footballers
Association football goalkeepers
1985 births
Living people
Czech First League players
FC Viktoria Plzeň players
1. FK Příbram players
FC Zbrojovka Brno players
FC Baník Ostrava players
FK Bohemians Prague (Střížkov) players
FK Baník Sokolov players
SpVgg Bayern Hof players
People from Cheb
Czech twins
Twin sportspeople
Regionalliga players
Sportspeople from the Karlovy Vary Region